Les voitures versées (1808) is an opéra comique in two acts by François-Adrien Boieldieu after Amour et mystère, ou Lequel est mon cousin? (1807) and before Rien de trop, ou Les deux paravents (1810). The libretto is based on Emmanuel Dupaty's comedy Le séducteur en voyage (1806). 

A revised version of the work was premiered at the Opéra-Comique on 29 April 1920.

References

External links 
 François-Adrien Boïeldieu - Les Voitures versées - Ouverture (YouTube)
 Les voitures versées on Gallica
 Les voitures versées (music) on Gallica
 Les voitures versées on IMLSP
 Les voitures versée on Vimeo
 Les voitures versées (complete sheet music)

Operas by François-Adrien Boïeldieu
French-language operas
Opéras comiques
1808 operas